Gideon Frank Rothwell (April 24, 1836 – January 18, 1894) was a U.S. Representative from Missouri. Born near Fulton, Missouri, Rothwell was graduated from the University of Missouri in Columbia. He studied law and was admitted to the bar in 1864, commencing practice in Huntsville, Missouri.

Rothwell was elected as a Democrat to the Forty-sixth Congress (March 4, 1879 – March 3, 1881) but was an unsuccessful candidate for renomination in 1880. He resumed the practice of law in Moberly, Missouri. He was appointed in 1889 a member of the board of curators of the University of Missouri, and served as its president in 1890–1894 during the catastrophic 1892 fire. After first ordering the remaining Columns torn down, Rothwell, eventually declare  them structurally sound, creating Columbia's most famous landmark. He died in Moberly, Missouri, on January 18, 1894, and was interred in Oakland Cemetery.

References

1836 births
1894 deaths
University of Missouri alumni
Democratic Party members of the United States House of Representatives from Missouri
19th-century American politicians
People from Fulton, Missouri
People from Moberly, Missouri
People from Huntsville, Missouri
University of Missouri curators